Lauren Kinsella (born 1983 in Dublin) is an Irish jazz and improvisation music singer and composer.

Biography 
Kinsella moved to London in 2010, where she earned her master's degree at the Royal Academy of Music in London. After singing in a duo with Sarah Buechi (Sessile Oak, 2009) she started working on the British jazz scene with Laura Jurds Chaos Orchestra (Island Mentality) and in the band Thought-Fox, among others. In 2012 she co-produced All This Talk About (Wide Ear Records) with Alex Huber. She also played in duo with saxophonist Tom Challenger and in the sextet Abhra led by the French saxophonist Julien Pontvianne. In addition, she appeared in the project Somewhere in Between on the Birmingham Literature Festival with the actor Peter Campion. She also worked with Ian Wilson (I Burn for You) and in the theater project t The Last Siren. Currently (2018) she works in a duo Snowpoet with the pianist Kit Downes.

Kinsella was awarded the 2013 Kenny Wheeler Prize In 2015 she was a scholarship holder of the Birmingham Jazzlines Fellowship. She also received commissions from BBC Radio 3 and the Marsden Jazz Festival. In 2016, she received a PRS Music Foundation for Women Make Music Award, and in 2017 a scholarship from the Arts Foundation. Kinsella teaches jazz at Leeds College of Music.

Discography 

 With Thought-Fox
 2013: My Guess  (Diatribe), with Colm O'Hare, Tom Gibbs, Mick Coady, and Simon Roth

 With Blue-Eyed Hawk
 2014: Under the Moon (Edition), with Laura Jurd, Alex Roth, and Corrie Dick

 With Snowpoet (Chris Hyson)
 2014: Butterfly EP (Self Release)
 2016: Snowpoet (Two Rivers)
 2018: Thought You Knew (Edition)
 2021: Wait For Me (Edition)

 With Julien Pontvianne, Francesco Diodati, Hannah Marshall, Alexandre Herer, and Matteo Bortone
 2016: Abhra (Onze Heures Onze)

References

External links 
 
 
 

1983 births
Living people
Irish women composers
Irish jazz singers
Jazz composers
Musicians from Dublin (city)